Clubul Sportiv Rapid București, commonly known as CS Rapid București, Rapid București, or simply Rapid, is a Romanian basketball club based in Bucharest, currently participates in the Liga Națională, the top-tier league in Romania. The team represents the basketball men's section of CS Rapid București, a multi-sports club.

Rapid won a national title in 1951 and finished three times third, in 1961, 1964 and 1983, but in the last years played mostly in the second-tier Liga I. However, in 2018 the league was merged with the top-tier Liga Națională.

Honours
Liga Națională
Champions (1): 1951

Current roster

Depth chart

References

External links
 Official website

Sport in Bucharest
1934 establishments in Romania
Basketball teams in Romania
Basketball teams established in 1934